Dáinn (Old Norse: , "Dead") or Dain is a character in Norse mythology.  Mostly the tales relate to him being a dwarf and in others as king of elves.

A King's Sword
His name is found on king Högni's sword Dáinsleif  ("Dáinn's legacy"). It is laid with a curse which says it must always kill a man when it is drawn.

Other Legends
In the Hyndluljóð (7) he is said to have made Freyja's boar Hildisvíni, along with another dwarf, his brother Nabbi.

Dáinn is referred to as a dwarf in the dwarf-þula of the Völuspá (11) and in a stanza by Sigvatr Þórðarson. But in the Hávamál  (153) he is said to be an elf who carved the runes:

"Odin for Aesir, and Dain for the elves,Dvalin for the dwarfs,Asvid for the giants,I myself carve some".
~~Havamal 143

In Norse Astrology
In the constellations of Norse mythology there is also a constellation named after Dain, one that resembles a deer. It is considered as an elven name. Whereas there is also a constellation named Dvalin, which is considered a dwarf name and constellation.

J.R.R. Tolkien
In The Hobbit by J. R. R. Tolkien, Dáin II Ironfoot is a Dwarvish King who helps his cousin Thorin Oakenshield in the Battle of the Five Armies.

References

Norse dwarves
Elves